This is a list of all birds recorded in the wild in the Korean Peninsula and its islands.

Loons

Order: GaviiformesFamily: Gaviidae

The loons migrate to Korea during the winter months. They are carnivores and some species can dive more than 200 feet below the surface of the water to search for food.

Red-throated loon, Gavia stellata
Black-throated loon, Gavia arctica
Pacific loon, Gavia pacifica
Yellow-billed loon, Gavia adamsii

Grebes

Order: PodicipediformesFamily: Podicipedidae

Grebes are small to medium-large in size, have lobed toes and are excellent swimmers and divers. However, they have their feet placed far back on the body, making them quite ungainly on land. They leave the water only to nest, walking very short distances upright like penguins. They can run for a short distance, but often fall over. 

Little grebe, Tachybaptus ruficollis
Red-necked grebe, Podiceps grisegena
Great crested grebe, Podiceps cristatus
Horned grebe, Podiceps auritus
Black-necked grebe, Podiceps nigricollis

Albatrosses

Order: ProcellariidaeFamily: Diomedeidae
Once common, it was brought to the edge of extinction by the trade in feathers, but with protection has recently made a recovery. Their main diet consists of squid, however they are known to follow fishing vessels for the left over morsels.

Short-tailed albatross, Phoebastria albatrus

Petrels and shearwaters

Order: ProcellariiformesFamily: Procellariidae

The family Procellariidae is the main radiation of medium-sized "true petrels", characterised by united nostrils with medium septum and a long outer functional primary. It is dominant in the Southern Oceans, but not so in the Northern Hemisphere.

Streaked shearwater, Calonectris leucomelas
Flesh-footed shearwater, Puffinus carneipes
Short-tailed shearwater, Puffinus tenuirostris
Bonin petrel, Pterodroma hypoleuca

Storm petrels

Order: ProcellariidaeFamily: Hydrobatidae

It breeds on islands in the northwest Pacific off China, Japan and Korea. It nests in colonies close to the sea in rock crevices and lays a single white egg. It spends the rest of the year at sea, ranging into the Indian Ocean and Arabian Sea. It is essentially dark brown in all plumages, and has a fluttering flight, pattering on the water surface as it picks planktonic food items from the ocean surface.

Swinhoe's storm-petrel, Oceanodroma monorhis

Boobies

Order: SuliformesFamily: Sulidae

This group comprises medium to large coastal seabirds that plunge-dive for fish.

Brown booby, Sula leucogaster
Masked booby, Sula dactylatra

Cormorants

Order: SuliformesFamily: Phalacrocoracidae

Phalacrocoracidae is a family of medium to large coastal, fish-eating seabirds that includes cormorants and shags. Plumage colouration varies, with the majority having mainly dark plumage, some species being black-and-white and a few being colourful. There are 38 species worldwide and 4 species which occur in Korea.

Great cormorant, Phalacrocorax carbo
Japanese cormorant, Phalacrocorax capillatus
Pelagic cormorant, Urile pelagicus
Red-faced cormorant, Urile urile

Frigatebirds

Order: SuliformesFamily: Fregatidae

Frigate birds are built for flying; they rarely swim and cannot walk but can manage to climb around the trees and bushes in which they nest. They have a very light skeleton and long narrow wings and are masters of the air.

Lesser frigatebird, Fregata ariel

Pelicans

Order: PelecaniformesFamily: Pelecanidae

These large birds use their elastic pouches to catch fish—though different species use it in different ways. Many pelicans fish by swimming in cooperative groups. They may form a line or a "U" shape and drive fish into shallow water by beating their wings on the surface.

Spot-billed pelican Pelecanus philippensis
Dalmatian pelican, Pelecanus crispus

Herons

Order: PelecaniformesFamily: Ardeidae

Large wading birds found in most temperate regions but most numerous in tropical and subtropical areas. Most herons roost and nest in large colonies called heronries; others are gregarious only at breeding time; and some are entirely solitary.

Eastern great egret, Ardea modesta
Grey heron, Ardea cinerea
Purple heron, Ardea purpurea
Little egret, Egretta garzetta
Chinese egret, Egretta eulophotes
Pacific reef egret, Egretta sacra
Intermediate egret, Mesophoyx intermedia
Cattle egret, Bubulcus ibis
Chinese pond heron, Ardeola bacchus
Striated heron, Butorides striata
Black-crowned night heron, Nycticorax nycticorax
Japanese night heron, Gorsachius goisagi
Yellow bittern, Ixobrychus sinensis
Schrenck's bittern, Ixobrychus eurhythmus
Cinnamon bittern, Ixobrychus cinnamomeus
Black bittern, Ixobrychus flavicollis
Great bittern, Botaurus stellaris

Ibises and spoonbills

Order: PelecaniformesFamily: Threskiornithidae

Ibises and spoonbills occur primarily in freshwater and estuarine habitats, including swamps, marshes, coastal mangroves, rice fields, rivers and ponds. Ibises and spoonbills are widely distributed in the warmer regions of the world and are especially abundant in the tropics of Africa, Asia and South America.

Black-headed ibis, Threskiornis melanocephalus
Crested ibis, Nipponia nippon
Eurasian spoonbill, Platalea leucorodia
Black-faced spoonbill, Platalea minor

Storks

Order: CiconiiformesFamily: Ciconiidae

The storks are large, long-legged, long-necked wading birds with long stout bills. They occur in most of the warmer regions of the world. They tend to live in drier habitats than their relatives the herons, spoonbills and ibises, and lack the powder down that those groups use to clean off fish slime. Many species are migratory. Storks eat frogs, fish and small birds or mammals 

Black stork, Ciconia nigra
Oriental stork, Ciconia boyciana

Ducks, geese and swans
Order: AnseriformesFamily: Anatidae

The family Anatidae includes the ducks and most duck-like waterfowl, such as geese and swans. These birds are adapted to an aquatic existence with webbed feet, bills which are flattened to a greater or lesser extent, and feathers that are excellent at shedding water due to special oils.

 
Mute swan, Cygnus olor
Whooper swan, Cygnus cygnus
Tundra swan, Cygnus columbianus
Swan goose, Anser cygnoides
Taiga bean-goose, Anser fabalis
Tundra bean-goose, Anser serrirostris
Greater white-fronted goose, Anser albifrons
Lesser white-fronted goose, Anser erythropus
Greylag goose, Anser anser
Snow goose, Chen caerulescens
Emperor goose, Chen canagica
Canada goose, Branta canadensis
Brent goose, Branta bernicla
Ruddy shelduck, Tadorna ferruginea
Crested shelduck, Tadorna cristata
Common shelduck, Tadorna tadorna
Mandarin duck, Aix galericulata
Gadwall, Anas strepera
Falcated duck, Anas falcata
Eurasian wigeon, Anas penelope
American wigeon, Anas americana
American black duck, Anas rubripes
Mallard, Anas platyrhynchos
Indian spot-billed duck, Anas poecilorhyncha
Eastern spot-billed duck, Anas zonorhyncha
Northern shoveler, Anas clypeata
Northern pintail, Anas acuta
Garganey, Anas querquedula
Baikal teal, Anas formosa
Common teal, Anas crecca
Common pochard, Aythya ferina
Canvasback, Aythya valisineria
Redhead, Aythya americana
Baer's pochard, Aythya baeri
Tufted duck, Aythya fuligula
Greater scaup, Aythya marila
Red-crested pochard, Netta rufina
Harlequin duck, Histrionicus histrionicus
Long-tailed duck, Clangula hyemalis
Black scoter, Melanitta americana
Velvet scoter, Melanitta fusca
Stejneger's scoter, Melanitta stejnegeri
Common goldeneye, Bucephala clangula
Barrow's goldeneye, Bucephala islandica
Smew, Mergellus albellus
Red-breasted merganser, Mergus serrator
Scaly-sided merganser, Mergus squamatus
Common merganser, Mergus merganser

Osprey
Order: AccipitriformesFamily: Pandionidae
The osprey (Pandion haliaetus) is a medium large raptor which is a specialist fish-eater with a worldwide distribution. The osprey (Pandion haliaetus) is a medium large raptor which is a specialist fish-eater with a worldwide distribution. The osprey is particularly well adapted to its diet, with reversible outer toes, closable nostrils to keep out water during dives and backwards facing scales on the talons which act as barbs to help catch fish. It locates its prey from the air, often hovering prior to plunging feet-first into the water to seize a fish.

Osprey, Pandion haliaetus

Hawks, kites and eagles

Order: AccipitriformesFamily: Accipitridae

From the family Accipitridae, they range from small to large birds with strongly hooked bills and variable morphology based on diet. They feed on a range of prey items from insects to medium-sized mammals, with a number feeding on carrion

Oriental honey-buzzard, Pernis ptilorhynchus
Black-eared kite, Milvus migrans
White-tailed eagle, Haliaeetus albicilla
Steller's sea-eagle, Haliaeetus pelagicus
Lammergeier, Gypaetus barbatus
Eurasian black vulture, Aegypius monachus
Eastern marsh-harrier, Circus spilonotus
Northern harrier, Circus cyaneus
Pied harrier, Circus melanoleucos
Japanese sparrowhawk, Accipiter gularis
Eurasian sparrowhawk, Accipiter nisus
Northern goshawk, Accipiter gentilis
Chinese goshawk, Accipiter soloensis
Grey-faced buzzard, Butastur indicus
Common buzzard, Buteo buteo
Upland buzzard, Buteo hemilasius
Rough-legged hawk, Buteo lagopus
Greater spotted eagle, Clanga clanga
Steppe eagle, Aquila nipalensis
Eastern imperial eagle, Aquila heliaca
Golden eagle, Aquila chrysaetos
Mountain hawk-eagle, Nisaetus nipalensis
Crested serpent eagle, Spilornis cheela

Falcons

Order: FalconiformesFamily: Falconidae

Falcons have thin, pointed wings, which allow them to dive at extremely high speeds. (Peregrine falcons, the fastest animals on Earth, are said to have reached speeds of up to 200 mph.)

Peregrine falcon, Falco peregrinus
Eurasian hobby, Falco subbuteo
Common kestrel, Falco tinnunculus
Amur falcon, Falco amurensis
Merlin, Falco columbarius
Saker falcon, Falco cherrug

Pheasants and grouse

Order: GalliformesFamily: Phasianidae

Phasianidae consists of the pheasants and their allies; the grouse are sometimes considered to make up a separate family, the Tetraonidae. These are terrestrial species, variable in size but generally plump with broad relatively short wings. Many species are gamebirds or have been domesticated as a food source for humans. There are 180 species worldwide and 4 species in Korea.

Japanese quail, Coturnix japonica
Common pheasant, Phasianus colchicus
Black grouse, Lyrurus tetrix
Hazel grouse, Tetrastes bonasia

Buttonquail

Order: TurniciformesFamily: Turnicidae

The buttonquails or hemipodes are a small family of birds which resemble, but are unrelated to, the true quails. This is an Old World group, which inhabits warm grasslands. Buttonquail are small drab running birds, which avoid flying. The female is the brighter of the sexes and initiates courtship. The male incubates the eggs and tends the young. There are 15 species worldwide, with 1 species in Korea.

Yellow-legged buttonquail, Turnix tanki

Cranes

Order: GruiformesFamily: Gruidae

Cranes are large, long-legged and long-necked birds. Unlike the similar-looking but unrelated herons, cranes fly with necks outstretched, not pulled back. Most have elaborate and noisy courting displays or "dances". There are 15 species worldwide, 7 Korean species.

White-naped crane, Grus vipio
Hooded crane, Grus monacha
Red-crowned crane, Grus japonensis
Siberian crane, Grus leucogeranus
Sandhill crane, Grus canadensis
Common crane, Grus grus
Demoiselle crane, Anthropoides virgo

Rails and crakes

Order: GruiformesFamily: Rallidae

Rallidae is a large family of small to medium-sized birds, including rails, crakes, coots and gallinules. The most typical family members occupy dense vegetation in damp environments near lakes, swamps or rivers. In general they are shy and secretive birds and thus difficult to observe. Most species have strong legs and long toes which are well adapted to soft uneven surfaces. They tend to have short, rounded wings and to be weak fliers. There are 143 species worldwide and 9 Korean species.

Swinhoe's rail, Coturnicops exquisitus
Water rail, Rallus aquaticus
White-breasted waterhen, Amaurornis phoenicurus
Baillon's crake, Porzana pusilla
Ruddy-breasted crake, Porzana fusca
Band-bellied crake, Porzana paykullii
Watercock, Gallicrex cinerea
Common moorhen, Gallinula chloropus
Common coot, Fulica atra

Bustards

Order: OtidiformesFamily: Otididae

Bustards, including floricans and korhaans, are large terrestrial birds mainly associated with dry open country and steppes in the Old World. They make up the family Otididae (formerly known as Otidae). Bustards are all fairly large and two species, the kori bustard and the great bustards are frequently cited as the world's heaviest flying birds, since both may exceed 20 kg (44 lbs).

Great bustard, Otis tarda

Jacanas

Order: CharadriiformesFamily: Jacanidae

Jacanas are identifiable by their huge feet and claws which enable them to walk on floating vegetation in the shallow lakes that are their preferred habitat. The females are larger than the males, and some species are polyandrous. However, adults of both sexes look identical, as with most shorebirds. They feed on insects and other invertebrates picked from the floating vegetation or the water's surface. Most species are sedentary, but the pheasant-tailed jacana migrates from the north of its range into peninsular India and southeast Asia. It is the only one of the world's 8 jacana species found in Korea.

Pheasant-tailed jacana, Hydrophasianus chirurgus

Painted snipes

Order: CharadriiformesFamily: Rostratulidae

Painted snipes are short-legged, long-billed birds similar in shape to the true snipes, but much more brightly coloured. The female is brighter than the male and takes the lead in courtship. The male incubates the eggs, usually four, in a nest on the ground or floating for about 20 days. All three species live in reedy swampland, and their diet consists of annelid worms and other invertebrates, which they find with their long bills. There are 3 species worldwide, of which only one is recorded from Korea.

Greater painted-snipe, Rostratula benghalensis

Oystercatchers

Order: CharadriiformesFamily: Haematopodidae

The oystercatchers are large, obvious and noisy plover-like birds, with strong bills used for smashing or prising open molluscs. There are 11 species worldwide and 1 Korean species.

Eurasian oystercatcher, Haematopus ostralegus

Stilts and avocets
Order: CharadriiformesFamily: Recurvirostridae

Recurvirostridae is a family of large wading birds, which includes the avocets and stilts. The avocets have long legs and long up-curved bills. The stilts have extremely long legs and long, thin, straight bills. There are 9 species worldwide and 2 Korean species.

Black-winged stilt, Himantopus himantopus
Pied avocet, Recurvirostra avosetta

Coursers and pratincoles

Order: CharadriiformesFamily: Glareolidae

Oriental pratincole, Glareola maldivarum

Plovers and lapwings

Order: CharadriiformesFamily: Charadriidae

The family Charadriidae includes the plovers, dotterels and lapwings. They are small to medium-sized birds with compact bodies, short, thick necks and long, usually pointed, wings. They are found in open country worldwide, mostly in habitats near water. There are 66 species worldwide and 12 Korean species, of which 3 breed in Korea.

Pacific golden plover, Pluvialis fulva
Grey plover, Pluvialis squatarola
Common ringed plover, Charadrius hiaticula
Long-billed plover, Charadrius placidus
Little ringed plover, Charadrius dubius
Kentish plover, Charadrius alexandrinus
Mongolian plover, Charadrius mongolus
Greater sand plover, Charadrius leschenaultii
Caspian plover, Charadrius asiaticus
Northern lapwing, Vanellus vanellus
Grey-headed lapwing, Vanellus cinereus

Waders

Order: CharadriiformesFamily: Scolopacidae

Scolopacidae is a large diverse family of small to medium-sized shorebirds including the sandpipers, curlews, godwits, shanks, tattlers, woodcocks, snipes, dowitchers and phalaropes. The majority of these species eat small invertebrates picked out of the mud or soil. Different lengths of legs and bills enable multiple species to feed in the same habitat, particularly on the coast, without direct competition for food.

Eurasian woodcock, Scolopax rusticola
Solitary snipe, Gallinago solitaria
Latham's snipe, Gallinago hardwickii
Pintail snipe, Gallinago stenura
Swinhoe's snipe, Gallinago megala
Common snipe, Gallinago gallinago
Jack snipe, Lymnocryptes minimus
Black-tailed godwit, Limosa limosa
Bar-tailed godwit, Limosa lapponica
Little curlew, Numenius minutus
Eurasian whimbrel, Numenius phaeopus
Eurasian curlew, Numenius arquata
Far Eastern curlew, Numenius madagascariensis
Spotted redshank, Tringa erythropus
Common redshank, Tringa totanus
Common greenshank, Tringa nebularia
Marsh sandpiper, Tringa stagnatilis
Wood sandpiper, Tringa glareola
Nordmann's greenshank, Tringa guttifer
Greater yellowlegs, Tringa melanoleuca
Grey-tailed tattler, Tringa brevipes
Green sandpiper, Tringa ochropus
Terek sandpiper, Xenus cinereus
Common sandpiper, Actitis hypoleucos
Ruddy turnstone, Arenaria interpres
Long-billed dowitcher, Limnodromus scolopaceus
Asian dowitcher, Limnodromus semipalmatus
Great knot, Calidris tenuirostris
Red knot, Calidris canutus
Sanderling, Calidris alba
Red-necked stint, Calidris ruficollis
Temminck's stint, Calidris temminckii
Little stint, Calidris minuta
Long-toed stint, Calidris subminuta
Pectoral sandpiper, Calidris melanotos
Sharp-tailed sandpiper, Calidris acuminata
Dunlin, Calidris alpina
Curlew sandpiper, Calidris ferruginea
Buff-breasted sandpiper, Tryngites subruficollis
Spoonbill sandpiper, Eurynorhynchus pygmeus
Broad-billed sandpiper, Limicola falcinellus
Ruff, Philomachus pugnax
Red-necked phalarope, Phalaropus lobatus
Red phalarope, Phalaropus fulicaria
Wilson's phalarope, Steganopus tricolor

Skuas, gulls, terns and skimmers
Order: CharadriiformesFamily: Laridae

There are 91 species worldwide and 23 species in Korea.

Parasitic jaeger, Stercorarius parasiticus
Black-tailed gull, Larus crassirostris
Common gull, Larus canus
Herring gull, Larus argentatus
Slaty-backed gull, Larus schistisagus
Caspian gull, Larus cachinnans
Heuglin's gull, Larus heuglini
Glaucous-winged gull, Larus glaucescens
Glaucous gull, Larus hyperboreus
Iceland gull, Larus glaucoides
Black-headed gull, Larus ridibundus
Saunders's gull, Larus saundersi
Relict gull, Larus relictus
Sabine's gull, Xema sabini
Ross's gull, Rhodostethia rosea
Black-legged kittiwake, Rissa tridactyla
Ivory gull, Pagophila eburnea
Gull-billed tern, Sterna nilotica
Great crested tern, Sterna bergii
Common tern, Sterna hirundo
Little tern, Sterna albifrons
Sooty tern, Sterna fuscata
Whiskered tern, Chlidonias hybridus
White-winged tern, Chlidonias leucopterus

Auks

Order: CharadriiformesFamily: Alcidae

An auk is a bird of the family Alcidae in the order Charadriiformes. Auks are superficially similar to penguins due to their black-and-white colours, their upright posture and some of their habits. Nevertheless, they are not closely related to penguins, but rather are believed to be an example of moderate convergent evolution. There are 22 species worldwide, with 8 found in Korea.

Common murre, Uria aalge
Spectacled guillemot, Cepphus carbo
Ancient murrelet, Synthliboramphus antiquus
Marbled murrelet, Brachyramphus marmoratus
Japanese murrelet, Synthliboramphus wumizusume
Least auklet, Aethia pusilla
Rhinoceros auklet, Cerorhinca monocerata

Sandgrouse

Order: PterocliformesFamily: Pteroclidae

Sandgrouse have small, pigeon like heads and necks, but sturdy compact bodies. They have long pointed wings and sometimes tails and a fast direct flight. Flocks fly to watering holes at dawn and dusk. They are restricted to treeless open country in the Old World, such as plains and semi-deserts. Legs are feathered down to the toes, and genus Syrrhaptes has the toes feathered as well. There are 16 species worldwide, with one species in Korea.

Pallas's sandgrouse, Syrrhaptes paradoxus

Pigeons and doves

Order: ColumbiformesFamily: Columbidae

Pigeons and doves are stout-bodied birds with short necks and short slender bills with a fleshy cere. There are 308 species worldwide and 7 Korean species.

Hill pigeon, Columba rupestris
Japanese wood-pigeon, Columba janthina
Stock pigeon, Columba oenas
Oriental turtle dove, Streptopelia orientalis
Red collared-dove, Streptopelia tranquebarica
Eurasian collared dove, Streptopelia decaocto
White-bellied green pigeon, Treron sieboldii

Cuckoos

Order: CuculiformesFamily: Cuculidae

The cuckoos are generally medium-sized slender birds. The majority are arboreal, with a sizeable minority that are terrestrial. The family has a cosmopolitan distribution, with the majority of species being tropical. The temperate species are migratory. The cuckoos feed on insects, insect larvae and a variety of other animals, as well as fruit. Many species are brood parasites, laying their eggs in the nests of other species, but the majority of species raise their own young.

Hodgson's hawk-cuckoo, Cuculus fugax
Indian cuckoo, Cuculus micropterus
Common cuckoo, Cuculus canorus
Oriental cuckoo, Cuculus saturatus
Lesser cuckoo, Cuculus poliocephalus
Chestnut-winged cuckoo, Clamator coromandus

Owls

Order: StrigiformesFamily: Strigidae

Owls are solitary nocturnal birds of prey. They have large forward-facing eyes and ears, a hawk-like beak and a conspicuous circle of feathers around each eye called a facial disk. 11 Korean species have been recorded.

Eurasian scops-owl, Otus scops
Sunda scops-owl, Otus lempiji
Eurasian eagle owl, Bubo bubo
Snowy owl, Nyctea scandiaca
Himalayan owl, Strix nivicolum
Ural owl, Strix uralensis
Northern hawk owl, Surnia ulula
Little owl, Athene noctua
Northern boobook, Ninox japonica
Long-eared owl, Asio otus
Short-eared owl, Asio flammeus

Nightjars

Order: CaprimulgiformesFamily: Caprimulgidae

Nightjars are medium-sized nocturnal birds that usually nest on the ground. They have long wings, short legs and very short bills. Most have small feet, of little use for walking, and long pointed wings. Their soft plumage is cryptically coloured to resemble bark or leaves.

Grey nightjar, Caprimulgus jotaka

Swifts and needletails

Order: ApodiformesFamily: Apodidae

The swifts are small birds which spend the majority of their lives flying. These birds have very short legs and never settle voluntarily on the ground, perching instead only on vertical surfaces. Many swifts have long swept-back wings which resemble a crescent or boomerang. There are 3 Korean species.

White-throated needletail, Hirundapus caudacutus
Pacific swift, Apus pacificus
Little swift, Apus affinis

Hoopoes

Order: UpupiformesFamily: Upupidae

There is only one species of hoopoe worldwide. Hoopoes are widespread in Europe, Asia and North Africa, as well as Sub-Saharan Africa and Madagascar. They migrate from all but the southernmost part of their range to the tropics in winter. Their habitat is open cultivated ground with short grass or bare patches. They spend much time on the ground hunting insects and worms.

Eurasian hoopoe, Upupa epops

Rollers

Order: CoraciiformesFamily: Coraciidae

Rollers are insect eaters, usually catching their prey in the air. They often perch prominently whilst hunting, like giant shrikes. They resemble crows in size and build, but are more closely related to the kingfishers and bee-eaters. They share the colourful appearance of those groups, blues and browns predominating. The two inner front toes are connected, but not the outer one. There are twelve species worldwide, but only one is found in Korea.

Dollarbird, Eurystomus orientalis

River kingfishers

Order: CoraciiformesFamily: Alcedinidae

The river kingfishers are one of the three families of bird in the kingfisher group.

Common kingfisher, Alcedo atthis
Ruddy kingfisher, Halcyon coromanda
Black-capped kingfisher, Halcyon pileata

Water kingfishers

Order: CoraciiformesFamily: Cerylidae

These are all specialist fish-eating species, unlike many representatives of the other two families, and it is likely that they are all descended from fish-eating kingfishers which founded populations in the New World. It was believed that the entire group evolved in the Americas, but this seems not to be true. The original ancestor possibly evolved in Africa - at any rate in the Old World - and the Chloroceryle species are the youngest ones.

Crested kingfisher, Megaceryle lugubris

Woodpeckers

Order: PiciformesFamily: Picidae

Woodpeckers are small to medium-sized birds with chisel-like beaks, short legs, stiff tails and long tongues used for capturing insects. Some species have feet with two toes pointing forward and two backward, while several species have only three toes. Many woodpeckers have the habit of tapping noisily on tree trunks with their beaks. There are more than 200 species worldwide and 11 species in Korea.

Eurasian wryneck, Jynx torquilla
Japanese pygmy woodpecker, Dendrocopos kizuki
Great spotted woodpecker, Dendrocopos major
Lesser spotted woodpecker, Dendrocopos minor
White-backed woodpecker, Dendrocopos leucotos
Rufous-bellied woodpecker, Dendrocopos hyperythrus
Grey-capped pygmy woodpecker, Dendrocopos canicapillus
Eurasian three-toed woodpecker, Picoides tridactylus
Tristram's woodpecker, Dryocopus javensis
Black woodpecker, Dryocopus martius
Grey-faced woodpecker, Picus canus

Passeriformes

Pittidae

 Pitta nympha, fairy pitta

Laniidae

Campephagidae
 Pericrocotus divaricatus, ashy minivet 
 Coracina melaschistos, black-winged cuckoo-shrike

Monarchidae
 Terpsiphone incei, Amur paradise flycatcher
 Terpsiphone atrocaudata, Japanese paradise flycatcher

Oriolidae
 Oriolus chinensis, black-naped oriole

Dicruridae
 Dicrurus macrocercus, black drongo 
 Dicrurus hottentottus, hair-crested drongo 
 Dicrurus leucophaeus, ashy drongo

Artamidae
 Artamus leucorynchus, white-breasted woodswallow

Corvidae
 Pica sericea, Oriental magpie 
 Garrulus glandarius, Eurasian jay 
 Cyanopica cyana, azure-winged magpie 
 Nucifraga caryocatactes, spotted nutcracker 
 Corvus dauuricus, Daurian jackdaw 
 Corvus frugilegus, rook 
 Corvus corone, carrion crow 
 Corvus macrorhynchos, large-billed crow
 Pyrrhocorax pyrrhocorax, red-billed chough

Bombycillidae

 Bombycilla garrulus, Bohemian waxwing 
 Bombycilla japonica, Japanese waxwing

Cinclidae

 Cinclus pallasii, brown dipper

Turdidae
 Monticola gularis, white-throated rock thrush 
 Monticola solitarius, blue rock thrush 
 Zoothera sibirica, Siberian thrush 
 Zoothera dauma, scaly thrush 
 Turdus hortulorum, grey-backed thrush 
 Turdus cardis, Japanese thrush 
 Turdus obscurus, eyebrowed thrush 
 Turdus pallidus, pale thrush 
 Turdus chrysolaus, brown-headed thrush 
 Turdus ruficollis, dark-throated thrush
 Turdus naumanni eunomus, dusky thrush (ssp. in Japan)
 Turdus naumanni naumanni, dusky thrush 
 Turdus merula, Eurasian blackbird

Muscicapidae
 Muscicapa griseisticta, grey-streaked flycatcher 
 Muscicapa sibirica, dark-sided flycatcher 
 Muscicapa dauurica, Asian brown flycatcher 
 Ficedula zanthopygia, yellow-rumped flycatcher 
 Ficedula narcissina, Narcissus flycatcher 
 Ficedula mugimaki, mugimaki flycatcher 
 Ficedula parva, red-breasted flycatcher 
 Cyanoptila cyanomelana, blue-and-white flycatcher 
 Erithacus akahige, Japanese robin 
 Luscinia sibilans, rufous-tailed robin 
 Luscinia calliope, Siberian rubythroat 
 Luscinia svecica, bluethroat 
 Luscinia cyane, Siberian blue robin 
 Tarsiger cyanurus, orange-flanked bush-robin 
 Phoenicurus ochruros, black redstart 
 Phoenicurus auroreus, Daurian redstart 
 Saxicola maurus, Siberian stonechat 
 Saxicola stejnegeri, Amur stonechat 
 Saxicola ferrea, grey bushchat
 Oenanthe pleschanka, pied wheatear

Sturnidae

 Spodiopsar cineraceus, white-cheeked starling 
 Agropsar philippensis, chestnut-cheeked starling 
 Agropsar sturninus, Daurian starling 
 Sturnia sinensis, white-shouldered starling
 Sturnus vulgaris, common starling

Sittidae

 Sitta europaea, Eurasian nuthatch 
 Sitta villosa, snowy-browed nuthatch

Certhiidae

 Certhia familiaris, common treecreeper

Troglodytidae

 Troglodytes troglodytes, Eurasian wren

Paridae

 Parus minor, Japanese tit 
 Parus varius, varied tit 
 Parus ater, coal tit 
 Parus montanus, willow tit 
 Parus palustris, marsh tit 
 Panurus biarmicus, bearded tit 
 Remiz pendulinus, Eurasian penduline tit

Aegithalidae

 Aegithalos caudatus, long-tailed tit

Hirundinidae

 Riparia riparia, sand martin 
 Hirundo rustica, barn swallow 
 Cecropis daurica, red-rumped swallow
 Delichon urbica, common house martin

Regulidae

 Regulus regulus, goldcrest

Pycnonotidae

 Ixos amaurotis, brown-eared bulbul

Cisticolidae

 Cisticola juncidis, zitting cisticola

Zosteropidae

 Zosterops erythropleurus, chestnut-flanked white-eye 
 Zosterops japonicus, Japanese white-eye

Cettiidae

 Urosphena squameiceps, Asian stubtail 
 Horornis diphone, Japanese bush warbler

Locustellidae
 Locustella lanceolata, lanceolated warbler 
 Helopsaltes certhiola, Pallas's grasshopper warbler 
 Helopsaltes ochotensis, Middendorff's grasshopper warbler 
 Helopsaltes pleskei, Pleske's grasshopper warbler 
 Helopsaltes fasciolatus, Gray's grasshopper warbler
 Helopsaltes pryeri, marsh grassbird

Acrocephalidae
 Acrocephalus bistrigiceps, black-browed reed warbler 
 Acrocephalus arundinaceus, great reed warbler 
 Arundinax aedon, thick-billed warbler

Phylloscopidae
 Phylloscopus fuscatus, dusky warbler 
 Phylloscopus schwarzi, Radde's warbler 
 Bradypterus thoracicus, spotted bush-warbler 
 Phylloscopus proregulus, lemon-rumped warbler 
 Phylloscopus inornatus, inornate warbler 
 Phylloscopus borealis, Arctic warbler 
 Phylloscopus trochiloides, greenish warbler 
 Phylloscopus tenellipes, pale-legged leaf warbler 
 Phylloscopus occipitalis, western crowned warbler

Sylviidae
 Paradoxornis webbianus, vinous-throated parrotbill 
 Sylvia curruca, lesser whitethroat
 Rhopophilus pekinensis, Beijing babbler

Alaudidae

 Calandrella cinerea, red-capped lark
 Alaudala cheleensis, Asian short-toed lark 
 Galerida cristata, crested lark 
 Alauda arvensis, sky lark

Passeridae

 Passer cinnamomeus, russet sparrow
 Passer montanus, Eurasian tree sparrow
 Dendronanthus indicus, forest wagtail 
 Motacilla alba, white wagtail 
 Motacilla lugens, black-backed wagtail 
 Motacilla grandis, Japanese wagtail 
 Motacilla flava, yellow wagtail 
 Motacilla cinerea, grey wagtail 
 Anthus richardi, Richard's pipit 
 Anthus godlewskii, Blyth's pipit 
 Anthus hodgsoni, olive-backed pipit
 Anthus gustavi, Pechora pipit 
 Anthus cervinus, red-throated pipit 
 Anthus roseatus, rosy pipit 
 Anthus spinoletta, water pipit
 Prunella collaris, alpine accentor 
 Prunella montanella, Siberian accentor

Fringillidae

 Fringilla montifringilla, brambling 
 Chloris sinica, grey-capped greenfinch 
 Spinus pinus, pine siskin 
 Acanthis hornemanni, hoary redpoll
 Acanthis flammea, common redpoll
 Leucosticte arctoa, Asian rosy finch 
 Uragus sibiricus, long-tailed rosefinch 
 Carpodacus erythrinus, common rosefinch 
 Carpodacus roseus, Pallas's rosefinch 
 Pinicola enucleator, pine grosbeak
 Loxia curvirostra, red crossbill 
 Loxia leucoptera, white-winged crossbill 
 Pyrrhula pyrrhula, Eurasian bullfinch 
 Coccothraustes coccothraustes, hawfinch 
 Eophona migratoria, yellow-billed grosbeak 
 Eophona personata, Japanese grosbeak
 Emberiza cioides, meadow bunting 
 Emberiza leucocephalos, pine bunting
 Emberiza jankowskii, rufous-backed bunting 
 Emberiza tristrami, Tristram's bunting 
 Emberiza fucata, chestnut-eared bunting 
 Emberiza pusilla, little bunting
 Emberiza chrysophrys, yellow-browed bunting 
 Emberiza rustica, rustic bunting 
 Emberiza elegans, yellow-throated bunting 
 Emberiza aureola, yellow-breasted bunting 
 Emberiza rutila, chestnut bunting 
 Emberiza sulphurata, yellow bunting
 Emberiza spodocephala, black-faced bunting 
 Emberiza variabilis, grey bunting 
 Emberiza pallasi, Pallas's bunting 
 Emberiza schoeniclus, reed bunting 
 Emberiza yessoensis, ochre-rumped bunting 
 Emberiza bruniceps, red-headed bunting

Calcariidae
 Calcarius lapponicus, Lapland longspur 
 Plectrophenax nivalis, snow bunting

See also

List of birds of North Korea
List of birds of South Korea

Notes

References and further reading

Collinson, Martin. Splitting headaches? Recent taxonomic changes affecting the British and Western Palaearctic lists British Birds vol 99 (June 2006), 306-323

birds
'
Korea